Midem is the acronym for Marché International du Disque et de l'Édition Musicale, which is organised annually in and around the Palais des Festivals et des Congrès in Cannes, France. The trade show, organized by Reed MIDEM, a subsidiary of Reed Exhibitions, is billed as the leading international business event for the music ecosystem and has been held since 1967. Several thousand musicians, producers, agents, managers, lawyers, executives, entrepreneurs and journalists from around the globe regularly attend the event, which is usually held at the end of January or early February. While delegates from recording, artist management, and publishers network, new artists showcase their material. Also live music is on show in the evenings.

The event is developing like the industry and is now focused on the core music business (labels, publishers, rights societies and more), the technology sector (startups, developers and big tech companies), and brands and the agencies that represent them (for music and brand campaigns). Since 2007, the Midemlab competition for companies working in musictech has grown in importance. SoundCloud, Spotify and Songkick are among the companies that have risen to prominence after showcasing there.

In December 2021, RX France - the organisers of Midem - made an announcement that they were cancelling the 2022 edition. A statement on their website stated simply, "Due to the lasting pandemic and following a review of its activity,
RX France has decided to no longer continue to organize the Midem event." In a separate communication, Midem Director Alexandre Deniot announced that RX France and the city of Cannes were in "exclusive and advanced discussions for the latter to take over the Midem brand".

Business role

Midem provides a forum for business talks, political and legal discussions. It is a market where global distribution and music deals are sealed. It also is a platform for showcasing new artists, musical trends and music-related products and services. So-called musictech, or music technology services, has featured more prominently over later years.

Attendance
In January 2013, Midem was attended by 6,400 delegates from 3,000 companies (out of which 1,350 had stands or pavilions of their own). The event was covered by 350 international journalists. Although there are attendees from all over the world, the majority of delegates have been from Western Europe and North America. In 2015 many more international delegates registered.

In 2020 and again in 2021, the event went entirely online due to COVID-19 restrictions. Not only was the south of France still undergoing curfews and restrictions, it was felt that many international participants would not be able to reach Cannes, and major companies would be reticent about sending employees into a potentially infectious environment. Midem promised to be back in Cannes in June 2022. This has been put in jeopardy by the December 2021 decision to stop running Midem in its current form.

Ceremony awards 
The conference has held some ceremonies awards, including Midem Videoclips Awards in the 1980s, compiled by Music Box and Eurotipsheet. Prebilled as an "international" competition, it recognized videos of European and Saxo-Anglo artists. The record companies submitted their videos for competition. 

In 1992, it was created the International Visual Music Awards, in association with SACEM (the French society for authors, composers, and publishers of music). In 1992, Billboard reported the ceremony was simply called the MIDEM Awards. In 2000, the MidemNet Award was created. Other ceremonies includes International Classical Music Awards, and the Cannes Classical Awards.

See also

References

External links
 Official homepage
 midemblog

Music conferences
Trade fairs in France